Wanted to Do One Together (also released as Ben and "Sweets") is an album  by Ben Webster and Harry "Sweets" Edison that was recorded in 1962 and released by the Columbia label. Webster had previously recorded with Edison on his albums Sweets (Clef, 1956) and Gee Baby, Ain't I Good to You (Verve, 1957).

Critical reception

AllMusic reviewer Scott Yanow stated "Tenor saxophonist Ben Webster and trumpeter Harry "Sweets" Edison, both veterans of the swing era (although associated with different orchestras), had long wanted to record a full album together. The results, a swinging quintet set with pianist Hank Jones, bassist George Duvivier, and drummer Clarence Johnston, are quite rewarding ... Nothing unexpected occurs but the melodic music is quite enjoyable".

Track listing 
"Better Go" (Ben Webster) – 8:58
"How Long Has This Been Going On" (George Gershwin, Ira Gershwin) – 5:31
"Kitty" (Harry Edison) – 7:59
"My Romance" (Richard Rodgers, Lorenz Hart) – 4:14
"Did You Call Her Today" (Webster) – 8:54
"Embraceable You" (Gershwin, Gershwin) – 4:07

Personnel 
"Sweets" Edison – trumpet
Ben Webster – tenor saxophone
Hank Jones – piano
George Duvivier – bass
Clarence Johnson – drums

References

1962 albums
Ben Webster albums
Harry Edison albums
Columbia Records albums